Tsmur is a rural locality (a selo) and the administrative centre of Tsmursky Selsoviet, Suleyman-Stalsky District, Republic of Dagestan, Russia. The population was 626 as of 2010. There are 8 streets.

Geography 
Tsmur is located 9 km west of Kasumkent (the district's administrative centre) by road. Kachalkent is the nearest rural locality.

References 

Rural localities in Suleyman-Stalsky District